The Ligue 2 season 2003–04, organised by the LFP was won by AS Saint-Étienne and saw the promotions of AS Saint-Étienne, SM Caen and FC Istres, whereas ASOA Valence, Besançon RC and FC Rouen were relegated to National.

20 participating teams

 Amiens
 Angers
 Besançon
 Caen
 Châteauroux
 Clermont
 Créteil
 Grenoble
 Gueugnon
 Istres
 Laval
 Le Havre
 Lorient
 Nancy
 Niort
 Rouen
 Saint-Étienne
 Sedan
 Troyes
 Valence

League table

Results

Top goalscorers

External links
RSSSF archives of results
Official attendance on LFP site

Ligue 2 seasons
French
2003–04 in French football